Smolajny  (formerly Smołowo; in German, Schmoleinen, Schmolainen) is a village in the administrative district of Gmina Dobre Miasto, within Olsztyn County, Warmian-Masurian Voivodeship, in northern Poland. The village has a population of 720.

History

The Warmian village of Schmoleinen was founded in 1290 near Guttstadt (Dobre Miasto) and Allenstein (Olsztyn) by Ermland (Warmia) Bishop Heinrich Fleming.
From 1350 it served as the summer residence of the prince-bishops of Warmia.  It was destroyed by war in 1414, 1454, 1519–21 and 1709 and was rebuilt each time.

In 1945, after the collapse of Nazi Germany, Warmia and Schmoleinen were taken over by the Soviet Union, then transferred to Poland as part of the Recovered Territories.  Smolajny has since remained part of Poland.

In 1975–98 Smolajny belonged administratively to Olsztyn Voivodeship.

Monuments
Located in Smolajny is a former summer palace of the bishops of Warmia built in 1741–46 in the Rococo style by Prince-Bishop Adam Stanisław Grabowski. The palace became the favorite residence of the famous satirist and fabulist, Prince-Bishop Ignacy Krasicki, who had served as Bishop Grabowski's coadjutor.  Krasicki established there a beautiful park and built a gate tower (1765). The palace building is now used by an agricultural school. 

The village also features 18th- and 19th-century houses.

References

T. Darmochwał, M.J. Rumiński, Warmia, Mazury, przewodnik (Warmia and Mazury: A Guide-book), Białystok, Agencja TD, 1996.

External links
Recollections of pre-war residents
History of the palace in Smolajny

Villages in Olsztyn County